Hahncappsia potosiensis is a moth in the family Crambidae. It was described by Hahn William Capps in 1967 and it is found in the Mexican state of San Luis Potosí.

The wingspan is about 22 mm. Adults have been recorded on wing from May to August.

References

Moths described in 1967
Pyraustinae